These are the results of the women's singles competition, one of two events for female competitors in table tennis at the 1988 Summer Olympics in Seoul.

Group stage

Group A

Group B

Group C

Group D

Group E

Group F

Group G

Group H

Knockout stage

References

External links
 Official Report : Games of the XXIVth Olympiad, Seoul 1988, v.2. Digitally published by the LA84 Foundation.
 1988 Summer Olympics / Table Tennis / Singles, Women. Olympedia.

Table tennis at the 1988 Summer Olympics
Olymp
Women's events at the 1988 Summer Olympics